"See a Victory" is a song performed by American contemporary worship band Elevation Worship released as the lead single from their seventh extended play, At Midnight (2019), on August 9, 2019. The song was written by Chris Brown, Ben Fielding, Jason Ingram and Steven Furtick. Chris Brown and Aaron Robertson handled the production of the single.

"See a Victory" was a commercial success, having reached No. 5 on the US Hot Christian Songs chart while becoming Elevation Worship's fifth top ten on the chart. It has been certified gold by Recording Industry Association of America (RIAA).

Background
"See a Victory" came into view with an announcement by Elevation Worship that it would be released as the lead single from the extended play At Midnight, the song's release being slated for August 9, 2019. The song, with its accompanying live performance video, was released that day, along with availing of At Midnight for pre-order. Elevation Worship announced that "See a Victory" will impact US Christian radio stations on January 10, 2020.

The story behind the "See a Victory" was shared in Elevation Worship's announcement of the song being released to Christian radio. Chris Brown said:

Composition

Music videos
On August 9, 2019, Elevation Worship released the extended live music video of "See a Victory" recorded at Elevation Church's Matthews campus on its YouTube channel. The lyric video of "See a Victory" was released by Elevation Worship on August 16, 2019. The acoustic performance video of the song was published on YouTube by Elevation Worship on August 23, 2019. Elevation Worship availed a Spanish acoustic rendition of the song, titled "Ver La Victoria" on their YouTube channel on September 18, 2019. On January 13, 2020, a "Living Room Session" performance video of the song was uploaded by Elevation Worship to YouTube.

Accolades

Charts

Weekly charts

Year-end charts

Certifications

Release history

References

External links
 

2019 singles
Elevation Worship songs
2019 songs
Songs written by Jason Ingram
Songs written by Steven Furtick